WAY-629 is a 5-HT2C agonist that reduces feeding behavior when administered to rats. It was used as a starting point for developing more potent and selective 5-HT2C agonists aimed at treating obesity.

References

Anorectics
Carbazoles
Benzodiazepines
Serotonin receptor agonists
Heterocyclic compounds with 4 rings